Brookula paranaensis is a species of sea snail, a marine gastropod mollusk, unassigned in the superfamily Seguenzioidea.

Distribution
This species occurs in the Atlantic Ocean off Brazil.

References

paranaensis
Gastropods described in 2006